Kosmos 1267 ( meaning Cosmos 1267), also known as TKS-2, was an unmanned TKS spacecraft which docked to the Soviet space station Salyut 6 as part of tests to attach scientific expansion modules to stations in Earth orbit. The module which docked to the station was the FGB component of a TKS vehicle launched on April 25, 1981. The spacecraft's VA return capsule separated and landed in the Soviet Union on 1982-05-26.

References 

Kosmos satellites
1981 in the Soviet Union
Salyut program
Spacecraft launched in 1981